This was the first edition of the tournament.

Aliaksandr Bury and Andreas Siljeström won the title after defeating James Cerretani and Philipp Oswald 7–6(7–3), 6–4 in the final.

Seeds

Draw

References
 Main Draw

WHB Hungarian Open - Doubles